Wesley Charles Vandervoort (May 3, 1926 – September 3, 1993) was an American race car driver from Colorado Springs, Colorado. He won the Pikes Peak International Hill Climb in 1967, when he was part of the USAC Championship Car. Vandervoort has a total of 5 USAC Championship races between 1965 and 1969. He died on September 3, 1993 in Colorado Springs, Colorado.

Complete USAC Championship Car results

References

1926 births
1993 deaths
Racing drivers from Colorado
People from Colorado Springs, Colorado
Champ Car drivers